Bobby Livingston (born February 10, 1965) is an American former cyclist. He competed in the 1 km time trial event at the 1988 Summer Olympics.

References

External links
 

1965 births
Living people
American male cyclists
Olympic cyclists of the United States
Cyclists at the 1988 Summer Olympics
Sportspeople from Cleveland